Eliud is a male given name which may refer to:

Eliud, legendary king of the Britons
Eliud (biblical figure), ancestor of Jesus in the Bible
Saint Eliud, British Christian monk and bishop
Eliud Poligrates (born 1987), Filipino basketball player
Eliud Williams (born 1948), former President of Dominica
Eliud Zeledón (born 1983), Nicaraguan international footballer

Kenyans
Eliud Wabukala (born 1951), Kenyan Anglican Archbishop
Eliud Wambu Mathu (born 1910), first African to sit on Kenya's Legislative Council
Eliud Mbilu (born 1942), Major General of the Kenyan Navy
Eliud Barngetuny (born 1973), Kenyan steeplechase runner
Eliud Kipchoge (born 1984), Kenyan distance runner and former world champion
Eliud Kiptanui (born 1989), Kenyan marathon runner
Eliud Kirui (born 1975), Kenyan cross country runner

See also
List of biblical names starting with E